William Dennis Gargan (July 17, 1905February 17, 1979) was an American film, television and radio actor. He was the 5th recipient of the Screen Actors Guild Life Achievement Award in 1967, and in 1941, was nominated for the Academy Award for Best Supporting Actor for his role as Joe in They Knew What They Wanted. He acted in decades of movies including parts in Follow the Leader, Rain, Night Flight, Three Sons, Isle of Destiny and many others. The role he was best known for was that of a private detective Martin Kane in the 1949–1952 radio-television series Martin Kane, Private Eye. In television, he was also in 39 episodes of The New Adventures of Martin Kane.

Early years
Gargan was born in Brooklyn, New York. He was the younger brother of actor Edward Gargan, whose birthday July 17 he shared. His father was a detective, and his mother was a teacher. He graduated from St. James School in Brooklyn.

On leaving school, Gargan became a salesman of bootleg whiskey to New York speakeasies and then joined a detective agency.

Stage
While visiting his brother on a musical comedy stage, he was offered a stage job which he accepted. He began his stage career in Aloma of the South Seas. He also appeared on stage in Animal Kingdom.

Film
Gargan's first film was Rain. Later, he played in Misleading Lady and had character roles in many Hollywood productions, including starring in three films as detective Ellery Queen.

He was cast in a number of stereotypical Irish parts in films playing policemen, priests, reporters, and blustering adventurers. In 1945, he played Joe Gallagher in The Bells of St. Mary's, starring Bing Crosby and Ingrid Bergman.

In 1935, Gargan went to England and made several films.

In 1940, Gargan was nominated for the Academy Award for Best Supporting Actor for his role as Joe, the foreman, in They Knew What They Wanted.

Radio and television

Gargan's first regular radio role was Captain Flagg on Captain Flagg and Sergeant Quirt, beginning in February 1942. He portrayed private detective Martin Kane in the 1949–1952 radio-television series Martin Kane, Private Eye, sponsored by U.S. Tobacco. He also appeared in the title role as a private detective in the NBC radio show Barrie Craig, Confidential Investigator, which ran from 1951 to 1955. He also portrayed Ross Dolan in I Deal in Crime, and Inspector Burke in Murder Will Out, and was host of G. I. Laffs 

On television, Gargan starred in 39 episodes of Martin Kane, Private Eye, which ran on NBC from 1949 to 1954 and was syndicated in 1957–1958 and on The New Adventures of Martin Kane, which ran on NBC in 1953–54.

Later years
Gargan's acting career came to an end in 1958 when he developed throat cancer, and doctors were forced to remove his larynx in 1960. Speaking through an artificial voice box, Gargan became an activist and spokesman for the American Cancer Society, often warning about the dangers of smoking. In 1965, Mutual of Omaha presented its annual Criss Award to Gargan for "his inspirational self-rehabilitation efforts and his outstanding contributions to established rehabilitation programs."

No longer able to act, he formed William Gargan Productions, making traditional films and television films in Hollywood.

Family
Gargan and his wife, Mary, had two sons, Leslie and Barrie.

Death

He died of a heart attack aged 73 on February 17, 1979, on a flight between New York City and San Diego. He was buried at Holy Cross Cemetery in San Diego, California.

Partial filmography

 Lucky Boy (1928) – bit part (uncredited)
 Follow the Leader (1930) – a gangster
 His Woman (1931) – (uncredited)
 Partners (1931, short)
 Misleading Lady (1932) – Fitzpatrick
 Rain (1932) – Sergeant O'Hara
 The Sport Parade (1932) – Johnny Baker
 The Animal Kingdom (1932) – 'Red' Regan
 Lucky Devils (1933) – Bob Hughes
 Sweepings (1933) – Gene Pardway
 The Story of Temple Drake (1933) – Stephen Benbow
 Emergency Call (1933) – Steve Brennan
 Headline Shooter (1933) – Bill Allen
 Night Flight (1933) – Brazilian pilot
 Aggie Appleby Maker of Men (1933) – Red Branahan
 Four Frightened People (1934) – Stewart Corder
 The Line-Up (1934) – Bob Curtis
 Strictly Dynamite (1934) – George Ross
 British Agent (1934) – Bob Medill
 A Night at the Ritz (1935) – Duke Regan
 Traveling Saleslady (1935) – Pat O'Connor
 Black Fury (1935) – Slim
 Don't Bet on Blondes (1935)
 Bright Lights (1935) – Dan Wheeler
 Broadway Gondolier (1935) – Cliff Stanley
 Things Are Looking Up (1935) – Van Gaard
 Man Hunt (1936) – Hank Dawson
 The Milky Way (1936) – Speed McFarland
 The Sky Parade (1936) – Speed Robertson
 Mariners of the Sky/Navy Born (1936) – Lt. Red Furness
 Blackmailer (1936) – Peter Cornish
 Alibi for Murder (1936) – Perry Travis
 Fury and the Woman (1936) – Bruce Corrigan
 Flying Hostess (1936) – Hal Cunningham
 You Only Live Once (1937) – Father Dolan
 Breezing Home (1937) – Steve Rowan
 Wings Over Honolulu (1937) – Lieutenant Jack Furness
 Reported Missing (1937) – Steve Browning
 She Asked for It (1937) – Dwight Stanford
 Behind the Mike (1937) – George Hayes
 Some Blondes Are Dangerous (1937) – George Regan
 You're a Sweetheart (1937) – Fred Edwards
 The Crime of Doctor Hallet (1938) – Dr. Jack Murray
 The Devil's Party (1938) – Mike O'Mara
 The Crowd Roars (1938) – Johnny Martin
 Personal Secretary (1938) – Marcus 'Mark' Farrell
 Within the Law (1939) – Cassidy
 The Adventures of Jane Arden (1939) – Ed Towers
 Broadway Serenade (1939) – Bill
 Women in the Wind  (1939) – Ace Boreman
 The House of Fear (1939) – Arthur McHugh
 Three Sons (1939) – Thane Pardway
 The Housekeeper's Daughter (1939) – Ed O'Malley
 Joe and Ethel Turp Call on the President (1939) – Joe Turp
 Double Alibi (1940) – Walter Gifford
 Isle of Destiny (1940) – 'Stripes' Thornton
 Star Dust (1940) – Dane Wharton
 Turnabout (1940) – Joel Clare
 Sporting Blood (1940) – Duffy
 They Knew What They Wanted (1940, Nominated – Academy Award for Best Supporting Actor) – Joe
 Cheers for Miss Bishop (1941) – Sam Peters
 Flying Cadets (1941) – 'Trip' Hammer
 I Wake Up Screaming (1941) – Jerry MacDonald
 Keep 'Em Flying (1941) – Craig Morrison
 Sealed Lips (1942) – Lee Davis
 Bombay Clipper (1942) – James Montgomery 'Jim' Wilson
 A Close Call for Ellery Queen (1942) – Ellery Queen
 A Desperate Chance for Ellery Queen (1942) – Ellery Queen
 Miss Annie Rooney (1942) – Tim Rooney
 The Mayor of 44th Street (1942) – Tommy Fallon
 Enemy Agents Meet Ellery Queen (1942) – Ellery Queen
 Destination Unknown (1942) – Briggs Hannon – aka Terry Jordan
 Who Done It? (1942) – Police Lt. Lou Moran
 No Place for a Lady (1943) – Jess Arno
 Harrigan's Kid (1943) – Tom Harrigan
 Swing Fever (1943) – 'Waltzy' Malone
 The Canterville Ghost (1944) – Sergeant Benson
 She Gets Her Man (1945) – 'Breezy' Barton
 Song of the Sarong (1945) – Drew Allen
 Midnight Manhunt (1945) – Pete Willis
 The Bells of St. Mary's (1945) – Joe Gallagher, Patsy's father
 Follow That Woman (1945) – Sam Boone
 Behind Green Lights (1946) – Lt. Sam Carson
 Strange Impersonation (1946) – Dr. Stephen Lindstrom
 Night Editor (1946) – Police Lt. Tony Cochrane
 Murder in the Music Hall (1946) – Inspector Wilson
 Rendezvous 24 (1946) – Agent Larry Cameron
 Hot Cargo (1946) – Joe Harkness
 Till the End of Time (1946) – Sgt. Gunny Watrous
 Swell Guy (1946) – Martin Duncan
 The Argyle Secrets (1948) – Harry Mitchell
 Waterfront at Midnight (1948) – Mike Hanrohan
 Dynamite (1949) – 'Gunner' Peterson
 Miracle in the Rain (1956) – Harry Wood
 The Rawhide Years (1956) – Marshal Sommers

Radio appearances

Book
Gargan's autobiography Why Me? was published by Doubleday in 1969. A reviewer described the book as "a compelling story of the life, faith and courage of a man who as an actor was a notable success."

References

External links

 
 
 William Gargan and Carole Landis in Behind Green Lights from YouTube
 

1905 births
1979 deaths
American male film actors
American male television actors
American male radio actors
American male stage actors
American people of Irish descent
People from Brooklyn
Male actors from New York City
20th-century American male actors
Screen Actors Guild Life Achievement Award